The Sandberg Price was a prize for the visual arts, which was awarded annually between 1985 and 2002 by the Amsterdam Fund for the Arts. The prize is named after Willem Sandberg, a graphic designer and former director of the Stedelijk Museum.

Since 2003 the Sandberg Price was abolished and incorporated into the new Amsterdam Prize.

Winners
1985: Toon Verhoef
1986: Thom Puckey
1987: Stanley Brouwn 
1988: René Daniëls 
1989: Marlene Dumas
1990: Kees Smits
1991: Adam Colton 
1992: Pieter Holstein
1993: Philip Akkerman 
1994: Jos Kruit 
1995: Moniek Toebosch 
1996: Ritsaert ten Cate 
1997: Aernout Mik
1998: Jan Roeland
1999: Rob Birza
2000: Job Koelewijn 
2001: Helen Frik
2002: Roy Villevoye

See also

 List of European art awards

References 

Dutch art awards